Sahiller is a village in the municipality of Seyidlikendyeri in the Khachmaz District of Azerbaijan.

References

Populated places in Khachmaz District